The Mercury Milan is a mid-size car that was marketed by the Mercury division of Ford Motor Company.  Named after Milan, an Italian city, the Milan was sold across the 2006 to 2011 model years across a single generation.  The smaller of two model lines developed to replace the Mercury Sable, indirectly succeeding the Mercury Mystique as the smallest Mercury sedan.

Unveiled at the 2005 Chicago Auto Show, the Milan was the first new Mercury sedan nameplate introduced since 1995 and would become the final nameplate introduced by the division.  Coinciding with the 2010 closure of Mercury, the Milan ended sales after a shortened 2011 model year; the final vehicle was produced on December 17, 2010.  The Milan was sold in the United States (including Puerto Rico and the U.S. Virgin Islands), Mexico, and the Middle East.

Throughout its production, the Milan was produced alongside the Ford Fusion at Hermosillo Stamping & Assembly in Hermosillo, Sonora, Mexico.

Model overview 
As the entry-level Mercury sedan, the Milan was slotted below the full-size Mercury Montego and Mercury Grand Marquis.  The Mercury counterpart of the Ford Fusion and Lincoln MKZ (introduced as the Lincoln Zephyr), the Milan was developed as the smaller of two sedans intended to replace the Sable (the larger being the Montego).  In contrast to the Sable, the Milan was produced solely as a four-door sedan, marking the first time since 1940 that Mercury did not offer a station wagon.

Chassis 
The Mercury Milan was built upon the Ford CD3 platform; a variant of the Mazda GG platform, it is used by the first-generations of the Ford Fusion, Lincoln Zephyr/MKZ, Ford Edge and Lincoln MKX.  Using a steel unibody chassis, the CD3 platform is equipped with front-wheel drive as standard.  In 2007, all-wheel drive became an option for versions with V6 engines.  In front, the chassis uses a short-long arm (SLA) double wishbone front suspension and an independent multi-link twist blade rear suspension with front and rear stabilizer bars.

Powertrain 
During its production, the Mercury Milan shared its powertrain with the Ford Fusion.  From 2006 to 2009, a 160 hp 2.3L inline-4 was standard, replaced by a 175 hp 2.5L inline-4 for 2010.  A 221 hp 3.0L V6 was optional, with output increased to 240 hp in 2010.  The Milan did not receive a counterpart of the Ford Fusion Sport, powered by a 3.5L V6.

The four-cylinder engine was equipped with a five-speed manual transmission as standard (the first manual-transmission Mercury sedan since the 2000 Mystique), with a five-speed automatic as an option.  Through its entire production, the V6 was offered solely with a 6-speed automatic transmission (shared with the Fusion and Montego).  For 2010, the four-cylinder engines were updated with 6-speed manual and 6-speed automatic transmissions; the 6-speed automatic on V6 engines was equipped for manually-controlled shifting ("Select Shift").

Body 
As with the larger Montego and Grand Marquis, the Mercury Milan shares a common roofline with its Ford counterpart. To distinguish the Milan from the Fusion, the model line was fitted with model-specific front and rear fascias. Along with a waterfall-style grille (derived from the Monterey and Montego), the Milan was fitted with projector headlamps, LED taillamps (extending into the trunklid), and a bumper-mounted license plate (trunklid-mounted on the Fusion). Dependent on trim level, the Milan was fitted with imitation matte-silver trim or imitation wood trim similar to that used in the Montego.

For 2007, the Milan underwent several minor revisions. Externally, Mercury added "MILAN" badging to the front doors. During the model year, a revision of interior panels led to an improvement in side-impact protection (along with an improvement in safety ratings from the Insurance Institute for Highway Safety). As an option, a DVD-based navigation system became an option along with a console-mounted MP3 auxiliary jack as a running change.

Unveiled at the 2008 Los Angeles Auto Show, the Milan underwent a major mid-cycle update for the 2010 model year alongside the Fusion and MKZ. While the rear fascia saw only a minor revision to the tail lamps, major revisions were made to the front fascia, including an enlarged grille, and reshaped headlamps and front bumper. The interior underwent a revision, including a redesigned dashboard. While not the first hybrid offered by Mercury, the 2010 Milan Hybrid marked the first Mercury hybrid offered as a sedan.

Trim 
During its production, the Mercury Milan was sold in six different trim levels, dependent on drivetrain configuration selected by the owner.  The base trim levels were I4 and V6, with the top trim (in line with the Montego and Mercury SUVs), I4 Premier and V6 Premier; V6 AWD or V6 Premier AWD.

For 2009, a VOGA special-edition option package was introduced, which included model-specific white leather seats and exclusive chrome wheels.

Safety
Tests on the 2010 Mercury Milan were conducted by NCAP (New Car Assessment Program).

Mercury Milan Hybrid

In March 2009, the 2010 Mercury Milan Hybrid was introduced with the Ford Fusion Hybrid to the US market. The powertrain consists of a 156 hp Atkinson-cycle variant of the Duratec 25 gasoline engine, 106-horsepower AC synchronous electric motor, and an Aisin-produced continuously variable transmission. When driving on electric-only mode (EV mode) the Fusion can achieve 47 mph and up to 2 miles of continuous EV driving. In city driving a full tank of fuel delivers .

Ford set a modest sales target of about 25,000 vehicles a year for the Fusion and Milan hybrids.  In total, 2,884 Mercury Milan Hybrids were sold.

Sales

Awards 

In November 2006 Consumer Reports ranked the Milan among the most reliable family cars available in the U.S.
Mercury Milan won Auto Pacific's 2006 Vehicle Satisfaction Award for midsize cars.
First six speed automatic transmission in the medium car class.
2007 Consumer Guide Recommended Mid-size Car
2007 J.D. Power & Associates Initial Quality Winner, Midsize Car Category
2007 Second Quarter U.S. Global Quality Research System study, 2nd place
2008 & 2009 lowest TGW ("things gone wrong") in midsize car category (analysis by RDA Group)

References

External links

 Ford Motor Company

Partial zero-emissions vehicles
Milan
Ford CD3 platform
Front-wheel-drive vehicles
Mid-size cars
All-wheel-drive vehicles
Sedans
2010s cars
Cars introduced in 2005
Hybrid electric cars